Age of Paranoia is the sixth studio album by Dutch punk hardcore crossover thrash band Vitamin X. It was released on May 18, 2018, through Southern Lord Records.

Recording and release
Age of Paranoia was recorded at Amsterdam Recording Company in Amsterdam, Netherlands and mixed by Igor Wouters. It was announced in March 2018 that the band had signed with Southern Lord Records. On April 12, the track "Modern Man" was premiered as a single through Bandcamp. The full album was released on May 18, 2020, on compact disc, LP, and via digital download and streaming. A second song "Flip the Switch" was premiered April 27 through Revolver (magazine) featuring special guest J Mascis of Dinosaur Jr. playing a two-minute-plus guitar solo played on Emmerik's 1980 Gibson SG. Another guest on the album is guitarist Bubba Dupree formerly of Void (band), Soundgarden and more recently Brant Bjork playing on the song "Rollercoaster Ride".

Track listing

Personnel
Vitamin X
Marko Korac – vocals
Marc Joseph Emmerik – guitar, vocals on "Road Warrior" and "Leave Me Alone"
Alex Koutsman – bass guitar
Danny Schneiker – drums

Guests
J Mascis - guitar (on "Flip The Switch")
Bubba Dupree - guitar (on "Rollercoaster Ride")

Production
Produced by Igor Wouters
Mastered by Dan Randall
Lay-out by Marc Emmerik
Artwork by Marald Van Haasteren

References

External links
Official website

2018 albums
Vitamin X albums
Southern Lord Records albums